Themacrys is a genus of South African araneomorph spiders in the family Phyxelididae, and was first described by Eugène Louis Simon in 1906.

Species
 it contains five species, found only in South Africa:
Themacrys cavernicola (Lawrence, 1939) – South Africa
Themacrys irrorata Simon, 1906 (type) – South Africa
Themacrys monticola (Lawrence, 1939) – South Africa
Themacrys silvicola (Lawrence, 1938) – South Africa
Themacrys ukhahlamba Griswold, 1990 – South Africa

See also
 List of Phyxelididae species

References

Araneomorphae genera
Phyxelididae
Spiders of South Africa